Hope Alvarez Cristobal is a Guamanian educator, activist, politician, farmer, and museum director. Cristobal is a former  Democratic senator in the Guam Legislature. Cristobal is known for advocating for indigenous rights of the Chamorro people.

Education 
Cristobal earned a Bachelor of Arts degree with honors in Secondary Education (General Science) from University of Guam. Cristobal earned a Master's degree in Education from University of Guam. Cristobal completed Doctoral classes at the University of Oregon in Eugene, Oregon.

Career 
Cristobal is a farmer and an educator.

In November 1994, Cristobal won the election and became a Democratic senator in the Guam Legislature. Cristobal served her first term on January 2, 1995 in the 23rd Guam Legislature. 
Cristobal was an activist who advocated for indigenous rights of the Chamorro people. Cristobal is known for sponsoring a Public Law 23-130, An Act to create the Commission on decolonization for the implementation and exercise of Chamorro self-determination. Cristobal is also known for a bill that established the Chamorro registry.

Cristobal is a history instructor at the University of Guam.

In 2017, a commission for the native Chamorro language has been re-established on Guam. Cristobal became a chairwoman of Chamorro Language Commission. Cristobal also became an instructor of history and culture of the Indigenous People of Guam.

Cristobal is a representative for Guam Coalition for Peace and Justice.

Cristobal is a museum director in Guam.

Filmography 
 2010 The Insular Empire.

Awards 
 2011 Public Citizen of the Year. Presented by National Association of Social Workers, Guam Chapter.
 2017 Proclamation for her decades of service at the Guam Congress. Presented by Guam Legislature.

Personal life 
Cristobal lives in Tamuning, Guam.

References

External links 
 Membron Kumisión Siha (Commission Members) at guam.gov
 CHamoru Language Competition Judges at uog.edu
 We are losing our cultural heritage at postguam.com
 A focus on four ‘hot-button’ issues of the day at saipantribine.com (keynote speaker Dr. Hope A. Cristobal)
 WOMEN IN PUBLIC SERVICE at congress.gov

Chamorro people
Guamanian Democrats
Guamanian educators
Guamanian women in politics
Living people
Members of the Legislature of Guam
University of Guam alumni
Year of birth missing (living people)
21st-century American women